Merkulov, or Merkoulov (masculine) or Merkulova (feminine) is a Russian surname.

People with the surname Merkulov

People in aviation
 Vladimir Merkulov (pilot) (1922-2003), Soviet flying ace

People in culture
 Lana Merkulova, Ukrainian singer, formerly of female pop-music band SMS
 Yuri Merkulov (1901—1979),  Soviet artist, one of the founders of the Soviet school of animation

People in sports
 Robert Merkulov (1931–2022),  former  Soviet speed skater
 Nina Merkulova (born 1945), former Soviet  alpine skier 
 Yulia Merkulova (born 1984), Russian volleyball-player
 Vladimir Merkulov (athlete) (born 1989), Russian professional football-player
 Mikhail Merkulov (born 1994), Russian professional football-player
 Alexandra Merkulova (born 1995), Russian rhythmic gymnast

People in politics
 Nikolai Dionisovich Merkulov (1869-1945), Foreign Minister of the Provisional Priamurye Government in 1921-1922
 Spiridon Dionisovich Merkulov (1870-1957), head of the Provisional Priamurye Government in 1921-1922, brother of Nikolai Dionisovich Merkulov
 Vsevolod Merkulov (1895–1953), Soviet politician and head of the NKGB